Beduino (1968–1991) was a registered Thoroughbred stallion, who was a famous sire of Quarter Horses.

Life

Bred by Justo F Fernandez in Mexico, Beduino foaled in 1968 and was a gray son of Romany Royal. His dam was a daughter of Rejected named Jo-Ann-Cat. His second dam was a daughter of Depth Charge (TB). Beduino raced for three years on the racetracks in Mexico, from 1970 to 1972. He placed second in the 1971 Clasico Windsor Stakes.

Beduino died in May 1991, having been euthanized due to old age. He was inducted into the American Quarter Horse Association's (or AQHA) American Quarter Horse Hall of Fame in 2008.

Pedigree

Notes

References

External links
 Beduino at Pedigree Online Thoroughbred Database

American Quarter Horse sires
1968 racehorse births
1991 racehorse deaths
AQHA Hall of Fame (horses)
Thoroughbred family 1-k